Chasing Zero: Winning the War on Healthcare Harm is a made for television documentary about preventable medical errors in healthcare narrated by and featuring actor and patient safety advocate Dennis Quaid. The world premier was in Nice, France on April 22, 2010, It aired on the Discovery Channel in the U.S. and Western Europe on April 24, 2010 with repeated broadcasts through May 2010. It has been provided free to hospitals and caregivers both as a DVD and by streaming video.

Content
Actor Dennis Quaid, the narrator of the film, shares the story of how his 12-day-old twins both almost died from multiple overdoses of heparin, a blood thinning medication. This led Quaid to become a patient safety advocate, author of medical papers, and teaming up with the producers of Chasing Zero to create the documentary. The film profiles families affected by medical errors, and champions efforts by medical professionals and patients alike who are working to reduce preventable deaths to zero.

The film interviews healthcare leaders from Mayo Clinic, Brigham and Women's Hospital, Johns Hopkins Hospital, Harvard University, and the Institute of Medicine, presenting their reactions to   stories from patients and professional caregivers who have been involved in medical errors.

Educational Use

Chasing Zero was available for free Continuing Medical Education credit through the Accreditation Counsel for Continuing Medical Education in partnership with the Discovery Channel and The University of Virginia School of Medicine and Public Health.

In October 2014, the United States Army used the book as a teaching tool .   It is also used   at the Minnesota Alliance for Patient Safety and the Frances Payne Bolton School of Nursing at Case Western Reserve University. It has also been used  on TED-Ed courses.

Awards
 2011 Winner Bronze in Film and Video, 32nd Annual Telly Awards
 2011 Winner Silver International Academy of the Visual Arts Communicator Awards

References

External links
 
  
 

American documentary television films
2010 documentary films
2010 television films
2010 films
2010s American films